Rafidayn may refer to:

Bilad Al-Rafidayn, an Arabic term for Mesopotamia
Rafidain Bank, the largest bank in Iraq
Tanzim Qa'idat al-Jihad fi Bilad al-Rafidayn, Al Qaeda in Iraq's Arabic name, using the Arabic term for Mesopotamia rather than "Iraq"